Thomas F. O'Neal was the first head football coach for the Eureka College Red Devils located in Eureka, Illinois and he held that position for two seasons, from 1915 until 1916.  His career coaching record at Eureka was 9 wins, 7 losses, and 0 ties.  This ranks him ninth at Eureka in total wins and second at Eureka in winning percentage.

References

Year of birth missing
Year of death missing
Eureka Red Devils football coaches